Entities is the debut album from Malefice, a British thrash metal/melodic death metal band from Reading, Berkshire.  The album was released 20 August 2007 and was produced by Justin Hill and Dan Weller of UK band SikTh.

A video for "Risen Through The Ashes" was also made to coincide with the release of the album.

Reception

The album received positive reviews from publications such as Kerrang! and Exclaim!. Exclaim!'s Bill Whish described it as "a solid, mostly consistent release".

Track listing
 "Empirical Proof (Part One)" – 1:36
 "Risen Through The Ashes"  – 3:40
 "Into A New Light"         - 3:57
 "Dreams Without Courage"   - 5:51  (Guest vocals Justin Hill - SikTh)
 "History Repeats"          - 3:38
 "Traitor To All You Know"  - 5:47
 "Horizon Burns"            - 4:33
 "Empirical Proof (Part Two) - 2:11
 "As Skies Turn Black"      - 3:55
 "Nothing Left"             - 2:57
 "A World Deceased"         - 4:33
 "Bringer Of War"           - 3:55

References

2007 debut albums
Malefice albums
Albums produced by Dan Weller